Uzi Island is an island in the south of Zanzibar, connected by causeway to the main island of Unguja. It is located immediately to the south of the main island's Unguja Ukuu ruins. The island is undeveloped and contains few occupants who temporarily dwell there for fishing.

References
Finke, J. (2006) The Rough Guide to Zanzibar (2nd edition). New York: Rough Guides.

Islands of Zanzibar